"The Good Old Song" (alternatively spelled as "The Good Ole Song") is the de facto school song of the University of Virginia. It is often said to be the university's fight song, although the actual fight song is "The Cavalier Song". It is set to the music of "Auld Lang Syne", a song frequently sung on New Year's Eve.

The "Good Old Song" is most commonly sung by Virginia Cavaliers fans following sporting events. Fans embrace as they sway back and forth, singing the first verse of the song, followed by pumping fists while screaming the chant. It is also sung at football games immediately following each Cavalier score (or the extra point attempt).

History and authorship
Various sources ascribe the authorship of "The Good Old Song" to Virginia Glee Club member Edward A. Craighill circa 1895 even though Craighill's 1922 article on the song disclaims sole authorship. The best documentary evidence to date indicates that the song's lyrics were more or less spontaneously composed by a group of students in 1893, and that by 1894 the song was already being documented in the student annual, Corks and Curls.

"The Good Old Song" was the university's de facto school song by 1900. Student referendums over the years have purported to give significance to other songs on occasion — "Virginia, Hail, All Hail!" and "The Cavalier Song" won a 1923 contest sponsored by the student newspaper, The Cavalier Daily, and were named the university's alma mater song and fight song, respectively — but they failed to gain traction and remain relatively unknown among the general student body.

According to the Virginia Pep Band, the university's band from 1974 to 2003, the university's Athletic's Department attempted to replace "The Good Old Song" with a more lively post-touchdown song during the 1970s. They relate that the students of the Pep Band refused to abandon the song in spite of the orders, and it is thus still played today.

Unofficial additions
Since the 1970s, it has become a practice of some fans to insert a chant of "Not gay!" after the line "Where all is bright and gay". Petitions and organized protests against the practice began in 2001.
Some fans, after that portion of the song, shout, "We like it that way!" while others shout, "Fuck Tech", instead referring to Virginia Tech, UVa's biggest rival. The university released a video in September 2019 requesting that students "Keep the 'Good Old Song' good" by refraining from using either jeer.

References

External links
Virginia Pep Band version
Virginia Glee Club, Virginia Women's Chorus, and University Singers version
Virginiana: Good Old Songs (exhibit at the University of Virginia Library)

University of Virginia
American college songs
Alma mater songs
1893 songs